

Men's events

Extra-lightweight (60 kg) 
Felipe Kitadai – Brazil

Mohamed El-Kawisah – Libya

Kim Won-jin – South Korea

Naohisa Takato –  Japan

Half-lightweight (66 kg) 
Charles Chibana – Brazil

An Baul –  South Korea

Masashi Ebinuma –  Japan

Lightweight (73 kg) 
Alex Pombo – Brazil

An Changrim –  South Korea

Shohei Ono –  Japan

Hong Kuk-hyon –  North Korea

Half-middleweight (81 kg) 
Victor Penalber – Brazil

Lee Seung-soo –  South Korea

Takanori Nagase –  Japan

Kodo Nakano –  Philippines

Middleweight  (90 kg) 
Tiago Camilo – Brazil

Gwak Dong-han –  South Korea

Mashu Baker –  Japan

Half-heavyweight (100 kg) 
Rafael Buzacarini – Brazil

Ryunosuke Haga –  Japan

Heavyweight (+100 kg) 
Rafael Silva – Brazil

Women's events

Extra-lightweight (48 kg) 
Sarah Menezes- Brazil

Half-lightweight (52 kg) 
Érika Miranda – Brazil

Lightweight (57 kg) 
Rafaela Silva – Brazil

Half-middleweight (63 kg) 
Mariana Silva – Brazil

Middleweight (70 kg) 
Maria Portela – Brazil

Half-heavyweight (78 kg) 
Mayra Aguiar – Brazil

Heavyweight (+78 kg) 
Maria Suelen Altheman – Brazil

References

Judo at the 2016 Summer Olympics
Judo